Clifford Jones was an English professional footballer who played as a full back.

References

Footballers from Rotherham
English footballers
Association football defenders
Gainsborough Trinity F.C. players
Burnley F.C. players
Accrington Stanley F.C. (1891) players
English Football League players
Year of birth missing
Year of death missing